Retro is the eighth studio album of Filipino singer-actress Regine Velasquez, released in 1996 through PolyGram Records. The album contains new arrangements of songs from the 1970s and 1980s such as Andy Gibb's "I Can't Help It", a duet with Remus Choy of Grasshopper, Melissa Manchester's "Through the Eyes of Love" and Foreigner's "I Want to Know What Love Is". Velasquez also did an acoustic version of Orleans's "Dance With Me" as a duet with her mother, Teresita Velasquez. Although most of the songs are remakes there are two songs ("Nothing Left for Me" and the lyrics to "Fly") with original content.

Track listing

 Notes
 "Fly" contains samples from "September" by Earth, Wind & Fire.
 "Mommy V." is a stage name for Teresita Velasquez (Regine's mother).
 "Bluer Than Blue" is not included on early pressings of the album.
 "Sound of Silence" (Prologue/Epilogue), "Looking Through the Eyes of Love" and "I Just Don't Want to Be Lonely" are originally titled "The Sounds of Silence", "Through the Eyes of Love" and "Just Don't Want to Be Lonely" from their original artists, respectively.

Personnel

Credits taken from Retro liner notes
Production
Ronnie Ng – arranger (tracks 1 & 15)
Beta Soul – arranger (track 2)
Don Manalang – arranger (tracks 4, 5, 7, 8, 11, 13 & 14)
Jeffrey Felix – arranger (tracks 5, 7, 8, 13 & 14)
Jerry Joanino – arranger (tracks 6 & 10)
Simon Chan – arranger (track 9)
Dindo Aldecoa – arranger (tracks 10 & 12)

See also
Regine Velasquez discography

References

Regine Velasquez albums
1996 albums
PolyGram albums